Nelson Olanipekun is a Nigerian human rights lawyer, entrepreneur and the founder & Team Lead of Citizens' Gavel. He is a graduate of the Ekiti State University and the University of Ibadan (master's degree). He started Citizens' Gavel in 2017 with the aim of improving the pace of justice delivery through the use of technology. He is notable for being a co-strategist and legal counsel for the End SARS campaign alongside Segun Awosanya in 2017.

Education
Nelson attended the Ekiti State University, and graduated with a LLB in 2013, after which he proceeded to Nigerian Law School where he was called to bar in 2014. While in Law School, he created an online platform that helps legal practitioners, law students and those interested in legal issues to interact with the view to collaborate and bridge the gap that comes with jurisdictional issues. In 2016, he proceeded to the University of Ibadan for a master's degree course in forensic science where he graduated in 2017.

Career
On completion of his law degree, he did an internship with Justice Development Peace Center in Ondo State. The internship introduced him to his early work in the development sector.
After his call to bar, Nelson Olanipekun worked with Bola Ige & Co. from 2014 to 2015 before proceeding to Oluwaseun Dada & Co from 2015 to 2017. It was at this time he came up with the idea to form his own civic tech organization due to time wastage in securing justice.
In 2017, he established Citizens' Gavel, a civic tech organization aimed at improving the pace of justice delivery through the use of technology after an incubation programme of Civic Hive (the incubation and media arm of BudgIT). He started operations in Lagos before opening offices in Ibadan and Abuja. It was known as Open Justice at the time of establishment.
Nelson, through Gavel, started the first Social Media legal aid initiative providing assistance for victims of human rights, domestic violence, bank extortion. He is known for his work on police brutality, coercion and extra judicial killings. As a co-strategist alongside Segun Awosanya and legal consultant to End SARS; a movement committed to the eradication of SARS (Special Anti-Robbery Squad), he and his team secured a presidential order to overhaul the squad. Gavel started with 9 staff members but has since grown to 16 full-time staff and works with over 150 lawyers across 19 states of Nigeria.
He started Gavel to help the poor access speedy delivery of justice. He developed the urge to provide legal aid regardless of economic constraints due to an experience he had when he was much younger. His father had taken a loan from the bank to run a grocery distribution company that went bad. Despite the fact that he had paid the loan money in full, the bank came to sell his house, which was used as collateral. It was with the aid of a pro bono lawyer that they were able to get justice and retain the house.
On the 7th of December 2019, he wrote to Clement Boutillier of the European Union to blacklist the Department of State Services (DSS) over the rearrest of Omoyele Sowore, convener of Revolution Now Movement. This was after the DSS operatives stormed the Federal High Court, Abuja to rearrest Sowore. He also asked the EU to place a travel ban on the DSS leaders.

Personal life
Nelson is a Christian. He once stated in an interview that he loves movies and video games.

References

Living people
Ekiti State University alumni
End SARS activists
University of Ibadan alumni
Year of birth missing (living people)